Tin Foil Phoenix was a Canadian post-grunge band from Winnipeg. The band formed from the ashes of a previous incarnation under the moniker of Sonic Bloom with core members Michael Allen Zirk and Steven Kray. Guitarist Fish joined soon thereafter. Bassist Paul Robinson joined the band in 1999 and two years later, they added another guitarist, Phil Cholosky.

In 2001, they released Hurry, an independent seven-song EP.  Its first single, Neopolitan, got a great amount of airplay on Canadian radio. The song soon caught the music industry's attention and the band was signed to 604 Records/Universal in August 2002.  The deal guaranteed the release of their debut album in the United States, Canada, the United Kingdom, Australia, Germany, Belgium, Luxembourg and the Netherlands.

In February 2002, the name of the band changed from Sonic Bloom to Tin Foil Phoenix because of legal concerns over the name expressed by their international label affiliate, Roadrunner Records.

Their first full-length album, Living In The Shadow Of The Bat, was released on September 14, 2004, by 604/Universal. They have a new single called 'Have A Nice Day' on their MySpace and their second album Age Of Vipers is set for release on 20 May. The lead single of Age Of Vipers is called "Hurry Home".

Members

Final Lineup 
 Michael Allen Zirk - vocals (d. 2022)
 Fish - guitar
 Phil Cholosky - guitar
 Yves Gagnon - bass
 Lyle Geisbrecht - Percussion.

Former 
 Paul Robinson - bass
 Steven Kray - Percussion

Discography

Albums
 Hurry (EP, 2001) - released as Sonic Bloom
 Living In The Shadow Of The Bat (2004)
 Age of Vipers (2007)

Singles
 "Neopolitan" (2002, re-released 2004)
 "Ms Genova" (2005)
 "Have A Nice Day" (2007) (online only)
 "Hurry Home" (2007)
 "Not How The West Was Won" (2007)
 "Man Of Constant Sorrow" (2008)
 "I Am An Aeroplane" (2016)

In media
 Their hit song Ms. Genova is featured in the new IPod Nano's music trivia.
 The song "The Stuff" was included on the game soundtrack of 2K Sports' NHL 2K10.

References

External links
 
 c4records
 Tin Foil Phoenix Universal Music

Musical groups established in 1997
Musical groups from Winnipeg
Canadian post-grunge groups
1997 establishments in Manitoba